Svetlana Kuznetsova defeated Elena Dementieva in the final, 6–3, 7–5 to win the women's singles tennis title at the 2004 US Open. She lost only one set during the tournament (to Lindsay Davenport in the semifinals). Kuznetsova became the third Russian woman, after Anastasia Myskina and Maria Sharapova (who won the French Open and Wimbledon, respectively, earlier in the season), to win a major that year and overall. This was also the second-ever all-Russian major final (the first being at the French Open earlier in the season, where Myskina defeated Dementieva).

Justine Henin was the defending champion, but was defeated by Nadia Petrova in the fourth round. As a result, Amélie Mauresmo became the new world No. 1 following the tournament.

This marked the first US Open main draw appearance for 2011 champion Samantha Stosur, who was defeated by Petrova in the second round.

The quarterfinal between Serena Williams and Jennifer Capriati is often considered the catalyst for the International Tennis Federation adoption of Hawk-Eye triangulation technology to review line calls. Hawk-Eye was unofficially used during television coverage for the match, with results suggesting several crucial points awarded to Capriati were incorrectly called. The most egregious of these errors was a potential Williams winner at deuce in the first game of the final set that appeared to be well within the left baseline; while the line judge called the ball in, the referee awarded the point to Capriati. Capriati ultimately ended up winning the deuce, the set, and thus the match. Following outcry from spectators and the press, the United States Tennis Association suspended official Mariana Alves for the remainder of the tournament and apologized to Williams. The ITF tested the Hawk-Eye system in an official capacity the next year, ultimately approving it for official use.

Seeds

Qualifying

Draw

Finals

Top half

Section 1

Section 2

Section 3

Section 4

Bottom half

Section 5

Section 6

Section 7

Section 8

Championship match statistics

References

External links
WTA Draw
2004 US Open – Women's draws and results at the International Tennis Federation

Women's Singles
US Open (tennis) by year – Women's singles
2004 in women's tennis
2004 in American women's sports